Somerton may refer to:

Places

Australia
Somerton, New South Wales
Somerton Park, South Australia, a seaside Adelaide suburb
Somerton Man, unsolved case of an unidentified man found dead in 1948 on the Somerton Park beach
Somerton, Victoria

United Kingdom
Somerton, Newport, Wales
Somerton, Norfolk, England
East Somerton
West Somerton
Somerton, Oxfordshire, England
Somerton, Somerset, England
Hundred of Somerton, a former administrative unit
Somerton, Suffolk, England
Somerton Castle, Lincolnshire, England

United States 
 Somerton, Arizona
 Somerton, Ohio
 Somerton, Philadelphia, a neighborhood of Philadelphia, Pennsylvania
 Somerton, Virginia, a former town in the defunct Nansemond County

People 
 Edward Somerton (died 1461), an Irish barrister
 Baron Somerton, a subsidiary title of the Earls of Normanton

See also 

 Somerton railway station (disambiguation)
Summertown (disambiguation)